Queen's House was a  former official residence of the President of Sri Lanka in Jaffna. A former Governor's residence during the colonial period, it was used by the Governor General of Ceylon until Sri Lanka became a republic. It was used by Presidents William Gopallawa and J. R. Jayewardene when visiting Jaffna. It was built in the 17th century as the residence of the commander of the colonial garrison of the fort. Situated within the Jaffna fort, it was damaged to a great extent during the course of the Sri Lankan Civil War and it currently under renovation.

See also
Queen's Cottage

External links
Conservation and Development of the Ancient Fort in Jaffna
Rise of ruins from ravages of war

British colonial architecture in Sri Lanka
Country houses in Sri Lanka
Former official residences in Sri Lanka
Houses in Jaffna